Árpád Érsek (born 22 June 1958) is a Slovak politician of Hungarian ethnicity from the former Most–Híd party who served as the Minister of Transport and Minister of the Environment in 2020.

References

Living people
Most–Híd politicians
1958 births
Transport ministers of Slovakia
Comenius University alumni
Politicians from Bratislava
Members of the National Council (Slovakia) 2012-2016